The 2022–23 Southern Indiana Screaming Eagles men's basketball team represented the University of Southern Indiana in the 2022–23 NCAA Division I men's basketball season. The Screaming Eagles, led by third-year head coach Stan Gouard, played their home games at Screaming Eagles Arena in Evansville, Indiana as members of the Ohio Valley Conference.

This season marked Southern Indiana's first year of a four-year transition period from Division II to Division I. As a result, the Screaming Eagles are not eligible for NCAA postseason play until the 2026–27 season.

Despite their ineligibility to participate in the NCAA tournament, the Screaming Eagles were invited to the 2023 College Basketball Invitational. As the No. 15-seed team, Southern Indiana was defeated by No. 2-seed San Jose State in the first round, bringing their season to a close with an overall record of 16–17.

Previous season
The Screaming Eagles finished the 2021–22 season 18–8, 12–6 in GLVC play to finish in second place in the East Division. They defeated Illinois–Springfield in the first round of the GLVC tournament, before falling to UMSL in the quarterfinals.

Roster

Schedule and results

|-
!colspan=12 style=""| Exhibition

|-
!colspan=12 style=""| Non-conference regular season

|-
!colspan=12 style=""| OVC regular season

|-
!colspan=9 style=| Ohio Valley Tournament

|-
!colspan=12 style=| College Basketball Invitational

Sources

References

Southern Indiana Screaming Eagles men's basketball seasons
Southern Indiana Screaming Eagles
Southern Indiana Screaming Eagles men's basketball
Southern Indiana Screaming Eagles men's basketball
Southern Indiana